

History and activities 
A larger contingent swims at the nearby Royal Brighton Yacht Club in the open waters of Port Phillip Bay,

Their swims include a weekly Sunday  "inside no-brainer" alongside Middle Brighton pier, and have organized annual competitive events including the  John Locco Winter Invitational, the Greg Fountain Winter Pier to Pub, the Iceberger World Championship of the Bay Swim, and the Olsen Hooper Summer Handicap Swim, and awarded an Iceberger International Swimmer of the Year.

The club's long-time organizer is former school teacher John Locco, elected to Brighton Council in 1984 when the Brighton swimming baths had been in danger of closing, and later served as Mayor as well getting into a fist-fight with Baths Manager Mark Greene. He is said to have founded the club in the 1980s, but swims were already taking place in the 1950s. In 2015 the Royal Brighton Yacht Club caused a dispute by seeking to formalize governance of the Icebergers.

Media 
British-Australian comedian David Brooks made a comic documentary about the group in 2013, originally titled Discovering the Icebergers and later An Iceberger with the Lot: From Bury to Brighton. Another documentary about the group, titled Icebergers and directed by Darcy Newton, won best documentary at the 2020 Melbourne Indie Film Festival.

Don Warner's Beyond The Tip: Tales of the Icebergers of Brighton was published in 2019.

Notable swimmers 
Ted Baillieu, Premier of Victoria from 2010 to 2013
David Brooks, comedian
Dan Canta, who joined the club at 13 and at 17 became the youngest male to achieve the Triple Crown of Open Water Swimming
Max Hudghton, former player for St Kilda Football Club
Stewart Loewe, former player for St Kilda Football Club
Andrew Robb, former Liberal politician
John Van Wisse, swimmer and trainer

References

External links 
 Brighton Icebergers at Royal Brighton Yacht Club
 Icebergers at Brighton Baths Health Club Sea Baths & Gymnasium

1881 establishments in Australia
Sports clubs established in 1881
Surf Life Saving Australia clubs
Sporting clubs in Melbourne
Australian swim teams
Swimming clubs
Winter swimming
Swimming venues in Australia
Water polo venues in Australia
Sport in the City of Bayside